Huttonella is a genus of land snails in the family Streptaxidae.

Distribution 
Huttonella was originally distributed in Africa and southwestern Asia. Today it is a tropical cosmopolitan genus.

Taxonomy
The genus has been described as "an artificial, non-monophyletic assemblage of pupiform, elongated streptaxids".

Species
Species include:

 Huttonella bicolor (Hutton, 1834)

References

Streptaxidae